Tales from the Kingdom of Fife is the debut album by Anglo-Swiss symphonic power metal band Gloryhammer. It was released on 29 March 2013 in Europe.

Story

In a fantasy version of 10th-century Scotland, as previously foretold (“Anstruther’s Dark Prophecy”), the evil wizard Zargothrax invades and conquers Dundee with an army of corrupted undead unicorns (“The Unicorn Invasion of Dundee”), kidnapping the princess Iona McDougall. The prince of the Kingdom of Fife, Angus McFife, swears revenge (“Angus McFife”); in a dream, he has a vision of three artifacts that will allow him to defeat Zargothrax, and sets off on a quest to acquire them.

McFife first battles north to obtain a magical war hammer (“Quest for the Hammer of Glory,”) then travels to Strathclyde to acquire a golden dragon as his steed (“Magic Dragon”). Inspired by memories of McDougall, who is imprisoned by Zargothrax in a prison of ice (“Silent Tears of Frozen Princess,”) McFife rides his dragon to Loch Rannoch and retrieves the Amulet of Justice from its depths (“Amulet of Justice”), completing his quest for the three artifacts.

Allying with the powerful Knights of Crail (“Hail to Crail”), McFife travels through Cowdenbeath (“Beneath Cowdenbeath”) to confront Zargothrax in his stronghold. As the Knights battle the wizard’s forces in the fields of Dunfermline, McFife and the Barbarian Warrior of Unst sneak into the castle through dwarven tunnels, aided by the hermit Ralathor (“The Epic Rage of Furious Thunder”). Meeting Zargothrax in single combat, McFife defeats the wizard and casts him into a frozen pool of “liquid ice.” He then uses the Amulet of Justice to free the princess and the unicorns, restoring balance to the Kingdom of Fife.

Track listing
All music and lyrics by Gloryhammer.

Personnel
Gloryhammer
 Angus McFife XIII (Thomas Winkler) – vocals
 Ser Proletius (Paul Templing) – guitars, choir vocals
 Zargothrax (Christopher Bowes) – keyboards, choir vocals
 The Hootsman (James Cartwright) – bass, choir vocals
 Ralathor (Ben Turk) – drums, choir vocals, orchestral arrangements

Additional musicians
 Marie Lorey – female vocals
 Dominic Sewell Community Choir – voices
 Brendan Casey – choir vocals

Production
 Lasse Lammert – production, engineering, mixing, mastering, choir vocals
 Dan Goldsworthy – artwork, layout
 Steve Brown – photography
 Amy Turk – orchestral arrangements

Charts

References

2013 debut albums
Napalm Records albums
Gloryhammer albums